NK2 homeobox 1 (NKX2-1), also known as thyroid transcription factor 1 (TTF-1), is a protein which in humans is encoded by the NKX2-1 gene.

Function 

Thyroid transcription factor-1 (TTF-1) is a protein that regulates transcription of genes specific for the thyroid, lung, and diencephalon.  It is also known as thyroid specific enhancer binding protein.  It is used in anatomic pathology as a marker to determine if a tumor arises from the lung or thyroid. NKX2.1 can be induced by activin A via SMAD2 signaling in a human embryonic stem cell differentiation model.

NKX2.1 is key to the fetal development of lung structures. The dorsal-ventral pattern of NKX2.1 expression forms the ventral boundary in the anterior foregut. NKX2.1 is expressed only in select cells in the ventral wall of the anterior foregut, and is not expressed in the dorsal wall, where the esophagus will emerge from. NKX2.1 knockout in mice results in the development of a shortened trachea which is fused to the esophagus, with the bronchi directly connecting this shared tube to the lungs. This resembles a complete tracheoesophageal fistula, which is a rare congenital condition in humans. Furthermore, distal lung structures do not develop in these knockout mice. Branching of the lungs in these mice did not occur past the main-stem bronchi, resulting in lungs that were smaller in size by about 50% compared to the wild-type mice. The epithelial lining of these distal structures did not show evidence of differentiation into specialized cells. This lining is composed of columnar epithelial cells and scattered ciliated epithelial cells. The proximal epithelium of the lungs showed normal differentiation, indicating that proximal differentiation is independent of NKX2.1. NKX2.1 is initially expressed in the entire epithelium, but is suppressed in a proximal-distal pattern as the lung continues to develop.

Clinical significance 

TTF-1 positive cells are found in the lung as type II pneumocytes and club cells.  In the thyroid, follicular and parafollicular cells are also positive for TTF-1.

For lung cancers, adenocarcinomas are usually positive, while squamous cell carcinomas and large cell carcinomas are rarely positive. Small cell carcinomas (of any primary site) are usually positive. TTF1 is more than merely a clinical marker of lung adenocarcinoma.  It plays an active role in sustaining lung cancer cells in view of the experimental observation that it is mutated in lung cancer. 

It has been observed that a loss of Nkx2-1 allows for deregulation of transcription factors FOXA1/2 (by relaxing histone deacetylation and methylation-mediated repression of Foxa1/2 by Nkx2-1) causing reactivation of an embryonic gastric differentiation program in pulmonary cells. This results in mucinous lung adenocarcinoma, a source of poor clinical outcomes for patients.

However others have found that TTF-1 staining is often positive in pulmonary adenocarcinomas, large cell carcinomas, small-cell lung carcinomas, neuroendocrine tumors other than small-cell lung carcinomas and extrapulmonary small-cell carcinomas.

It is also positive in thyroid cancers and is used for monitoring for metastasis and recurrence.

Interactions 

NK2 homeobox 1 has been shown to interact with Calreticulin and PAX8.

References

Further reading

External links 
 

Transcription factors
Anatomical pathology
Proteins